Ghost is the fourteenth studio album by Canadian musician Devin Townsend, and the fourth album in the Devin Townsend Project series. It was released on June 20, 2011, simultaneously with the third Devin Townsend Project album Deconstruction. Townsend has stated that the album "is the mellowest (by far) and prettiest record I've done so far".

Ghost was performed in its entirety once, on November 13, 2011, at the Union Chapel in London, England. The performance was filmed and recorded for the By a Thread – Live in London 2011 CD/DVD box set, along with performances of the other 3 Devin Townsend Project albums (up to that point).

The song "Drench", a leftover slated to appear on a second volume of Ghost, was shared by Townsend on his official SoundCloud account. Later, Mackie Gear posted the leftover track "Fall" on SoundCloud.

Reception

The album was well received by Metal Hammer, who said, "Ghost could be the most convincing album of his career".

Track listing

Ghost 2

Ghost 2 was an album intended for release in September 2011. As Ghost was originally to be a double album, but ultimately released as a single disc, Ghost 2 would have included tracks that weren't released on Ghost. Townsend has stated that these tracks were "too dark" and "heavier" than the rest of Ghost and therefore didn't fit with the intended vibe. On August 22, 2012, Townsend officially cancelled Ghost 2, saying, "I tried to finish Ghost 2 the other day, but it's not solid enough. Doesn't engage. Going to use the best bits and art for elements of Z²." Some of these songs were eventually released on the bonus disc included with Casualties of Cool.

Personnel
 Devin Townsend – guitars, vocals, bass, synth, ambience, banjo, production, mixing, engineering, design, layout
 Kat Epple – flute, woodwinds
 Dave Young – keyboards, Nord synths, harmonium, Ableton Live, mandolin
 Mike St-Jean – drums, percussion
 Katrina Natale – vocals
 Sheldon Zaharko – bed tracks engineering
 Troy – mastering
 Ryab Dahle – additional engineering
 Ryan Van Poederooyen – drum tech
 Jean Savoie – bass tech
 Brian Kibbons – photos
 Travis Smith – design, layout

Charts

References

Devin Townsend albums
2011 albums
Inside Out Music albums
Albums produced by Devin Townsend